Fernando Coimbra is a Brazilian film director, known for directing A Wolf at the Door (2013) and Sand Castle (2017). For the former film, Coimbra was nominated for the Directors Guild of America Award for Outstanding Directing – First-Time Feature Film in 2015.

References

External links

Living people
Brazilian film directors
Year of birth missing (living people)
Place of birth missing (living people)